The Namibia National Students Organisation (NANSO) is a national student organisation in Namibia.

Student Representation

NANSO has been representing Namibian students nationally since its inception in 1984. In 2016, the student organisation organised mass movements of Namibian students to demand free registration fees at the country's two major universities.

National executive committee

Notable former leaders

Regional Executive Committee (REC)

Notable Members 

 Fransina Kahungu

See also
Students Politics in Namibia
UNAM SRC
NUST SRC
NSFAF
Students Union of Namibia

References

Student organisations based in Namibia
Education in Namibia
Student organizations established in 1984
1984 establishments in South West Africa